WICA-TV, UHF analog channel 15, was a television station licensed to Ashtabula, Ohio, United States.

Richard D. and David C. Rowley, the founders of WICA AM/FM, started WICA-TV in the 1950s. Hampered by broadcasting on the (then relatively unknown) UHF dial, and with no network affiliation of any sort, WICA-TV had limited broadcast hours, a sparse and often overused film library, and a heavy amount of local programming (usually filmed with only one camera).

History

WICA-TV started broadcasting on September 19, 1953, but quietly signed off around June 21, 1956.

The Rowley family reactivated WICA-TV on April 4, 1966, with an intent of donating it as a non-profit educational license. As was in its first incarnation, WICA-TV was again hampered with no network programming, an often overused and limited film library of mediocre and low rental fare. In addition, WICA-TV still broadcast only in black-and-white (as was the case for many educational stations of this era) when most stations already converted to color, and still filmed local programming with only one camera, as well as only broadcasting on weekdays.

WICA-TV signed off again for good on December 26, 1967, with its license returned to the U.S. Federal Communications Commission. The UHF antenna is the sole remaining element of WICA-TV's existence, still affixed to the WREO-FM (formerly known as WICA-FM) tower.

See also
 WFUN (AM) (formerly WICA AM)
 WREO (formerly WICA-FM)

References
 Ashtabula's "Beacon" of Entertainment- Conclusion of the History Of WICA-TV 15 in Ashtabula, Carl Feather, Ashtabula Star-Beacon, January 16, 1995

External links
WICA-TV at the History of UHF Television

Defunct television stations in the United States
Television channels and stations established in 1953
1953 establishments in Ohio
1967 disestablishments in Ohio
Mass media in Ashtabula County, Ohio
Television channels and stations disestablished in 1967
ICA-TV
1956 disestablishments in Ohio
1966 establishments in Ohio
Television channels and stations disestablished in 1956
Television channels and stations established in 1966